Callyna laurae is a moth of the family Noctuidae.

Distribution
It is found in Equatorial Guinea.

References

Amphipyrinae